Edgar Wikner Percival (23 February 1897 – 21 January 1984) was a noted Australian aircraft designer and pilot whose aircraft were distinguished by speed and grace. Percival went on to set up the Percival Aircraft Company, a British aircraft company in his own name.

Early years
Percival was born in 1898 at Albury, New South Wales, the son of Blanche Hilda Leontina Percival, née Wikner and William Percival, a butter manufacturer. Edgar Percival's maternal great uncle was the Swedish philosopher Pontus Wikner.

As a child Percival assisted at his family's farm, on the flats of the Hawkesbury River at Richmond, New South Wales.  He also became fascinated by aviation, especially after seeing an aeroplane for the first time in 1911, when a local dental surgeon and pioneer aviator, William Ewart Hart, landed on the council field in Richmond, near the Percival property. After helping to maintain Hart's aircraft, Percival received, as a reward, his first flight. By 1912, when he was 14, Percival had designed, produced and flown his own gliders.

He attended Fort Street High School, in Sydney. Percival left school at the age of 15, to become an apprentice engineer at a Sydney firm. He later enrolled at Sydney Technical College, before undertaking a short course in aeronautical engineering at Sydney University.

First World War
In December 1915, Percival volunteered for overseas service with the Australian Imperial Force, as a Private with the 7th Light Horse Regiment. After being promoted to temporary Sergeant, he embarked in April 1916 for Palestine.

Percival requested a transfer from the AIF to pilot training with the British Royal Flying Corps (RFC), and was accepted in November 1916. After going solo in 20 minutes in 1917, Percival was assigned to No. 60 Squadron, a scout (fighter) unit in France, commanded by the Canadian ace Billy Bishop. Percival was noted for his flying skills and after he was promoted to Captain, transferred to No. 111 Squadron as one of its founding members.  With 111 Sqn he saw service in the Middle East and Greece. In 1918, while serving in Egypt, Percival designed his first powered aircraft, "a special-purpose aircraft based on the Bristol F.2B, with the Rolls-Royce Eagle engine". In August 1919 he was elected as a member of the Royal Aero Club.

Inter-war period
Following the First World War, Percival returned to Australia with three surplus aircraft, two Avro 504s and a de Havilland DH.6 aircraft to do film work, stunt flying and barnstorming plus charter flights, operating his own charter company. A number of notable flights occurred: in 1921, he surveyed the Melbourne-Brisbane route in an Avro 504, in 1923, he won the Melbourne to Geelong Race.

In Australia, Percival began to take a further interest in aircraft design; he built the winning entry in the 1924 Australian Aero Club competition to design a light aircraft. In 1926, flying an aircraft that he helped design, he competed in a Federal Government challenge for both design and piloting skills, winning £940 in prize money.

Later in the same year, Percival was involved in a landmark series of proving flights that helped establish the use of carrier-borne fighters, culminating in him taking off in a Sopwith Pup from the turret of the USS Idaho battleship, at Guantanamo Bay, Cuba.

Percival returned to England in 1929 where he was appointed as an Air Ministry test pilot, specializing in amphibians, seaplanes and Schneider Trophy racers and went on to set up his own firm, the Percival Aircraft Company, to produce his aircraft designs. Edgar Percival was also very active as a pilot during the interwar period; not only did he compete with regular success, but his designs were widely used by other racing and record-setting pilots who held his products in very high regard. Noted racing pilots of the time who also flew Percival's machines included C.W.A. Scott, Jim and Amy Mollison, Charles Gardner and Giles Guthrie. Many came to Percival to have their machines specially built and modified for the task in hand – usually to extend their already long range. 

Percival was a noted character on the air racing scene at the time, and was often referred to in the aeronautical press of the day as "The Hat," an epithet resulting from his omnipresent hat, which, characteristically (and resplendent in a lounge-suit), he also wore while flying. He was respected as a highly competitive and able pilot, taking great pride in being awarded the prize for "fastest time" in handicap air racing, as well as being a rather fiery, impatient and irascible businessman and employer. During this period, Edgar Percival served in the Reserve of Air Force Officers, 1929–1939 and was a founding member of the Guild of Air Pilots and Air Navigators.

Percival Aircraft Company
Percival's interest in aircraft technology led him to design the Saro Percival Mail Carrier (1930), one of a series of collaborative projects with Saunders Roe Ltd. Having had interests in the company which he sold in 1932, Percival began searching for an established manufacturer to produce a "light" aeroplane that he had designed which he called the "Percival Gull." Finding no company willing and able to take on production, Percival consequently started his own aircraft company as the Percival Aircraft Company. In collaboration with Lt. Cdr E.B.W. Leake (who was to become co-founder of Percival Aircraft), he arranged for the prototype Gull (registered as G-ABUR) to be produced by the Lowe-Wylde British Aircraft Company of Maidstone, Kent.

Running the business from his private address in London (20, Grosvenor Square), Percival then arranged for series production to be contracted out to George Parnall & Sons, of Yate, Gloucestershire, an arrangement that lasted two years. Percival Aircraft was officially formed in 1933. In 1934, after 24 Gulls had been produced at Parnalls, Percival set up his own factory at London Gravesend Airport, Kent.

Edgar Percival's aircraft were renowned for their graceful lines and outstanding performance. As a noted test pilot, Percival continued to fly his own creations; in 1935, he flew a Gull from England to Morocco and back to England, winning the Oswald Watt Gold Medal. He was the first pilot to fly from Britain to Africa and back in one day. He left Gravesend at 1.30am and returned to Croydon at 6.20pm. "Day trips in the future will be as commonplace as trips to Margate" he said in a broadcast at nine o'clock. Other famous aviators were associated with Percival aircraft; in 1933, Charles Kingsford Smith flew a Percival Gull Four named Miss Southern Cross from England to Australia in the record breaking time of 7 days, 4 hours and 44 minutes.  The New Zealand aviator, Jean Batten, also used the Percival Gull to fly from England to Australia in October 1936. A pure racing derivative of the Gull series, the Percival Mew Gull flown by other illustrious pilots such as Alex Henshaw and Tom Campbell Black would go on to set many speed and distance records in the 1930s.

In late 1936, Percival transferred production to larger facilities at the newly built Luton Corporation Airport in Bedfordshire. A two-bay hangar was constructed to accommodate the workshops while the design offices were set up in the original Georgian farmhouse situated nearby. Production at Luton was then primarily focused on the Vega Gull. A small twin-engined machine, the Q6 was also produced in limited quantities, using a pair of de Havilland Gipsy Six Series II powerplants equipped with variable-pitch airscrews. Again, the same basic method of construction was employed and the finished result was an aesthetically pleasing and aerodynamically clean feederliner of its day that represented the final new design produced by the company prior to Edgar Percival selling his interests in the company.

In 1938 with war imminent, Percival developed a military communications and R/T operator training version of the Vega Gull known as the Proctor. This rugged three-seater was powered by a 205 hp Gipsy Queen II engine. During the Second World War, a great deal of Proctor production was sub-contracted out and the designs of other firms, including the Airspeed Oxford and de Havilland Mosquito were, in turn, produced by Percival Aircraft at Luton.

In March 1940, Percival resigned from the company, his dual roles being taken up by P.D. Acland (formerly Aviation Manager of Vickers Ltd.) who was appointed Managing Director and Arthur Bage who became the Chief Designer. During the war years, Percival served in the Royal Air Force Volunteer Reserve.

Later years
Percival Aircraft was bought in September 1944 by Hunting & Son Ltd; Edgar Percival sold his interest in his company and moved to the United States to continue work on engine technology. From 1954, his old company began trading under the name Hunting Percival Aircraft Ltd; "Percival" was not dropped from the company name until 1957.

Percival became a naturalized US citizen in 1948.

He went to New Zealand in 1951, where he was involved with pioneering aerial application efforts.

In 1954, Percival formed a new company, Edgar Percival Aircraft Limited, at Stapleford Aerodrome, England. The company's first design, the Edgar Percival E.P.9 was a utility aircraft well suited to agricultural use. A total of 21 were constructed before Percival sold his company in 1960 to Samlesbury Engineering; the new company formed Lancashire Aircraft Company to continue aircraft construction of the E.P.9.

At the time of his death in 1984, Percival was working on aviation projects in the UK and New Zealand.

References

Notes

Bibliography

 Ellison, Norman H. Percivals Aircraft (The Archive Photographs Series). Chalford, Stroud, UK: Chalford Publishing Company, 1997. .
 Percival, Robert. "A Portrait of Percival." Aeroplane Monthly, Vol. 12, No. 9, September 1984.
 Silvester, John. "Percival Aircraft 1933-1954 (Parts 1-4)." Aeroplane Monthly, Vol. 11, No. 1–4, January–April 1983.
 Ord-Hume, Arthur W. J. G. "Percival aircraft : Edgar Percival, the man & his legacy : from racing gulls to jet trainer", 2013, Stenlake. .

External links
 Air Pioneers: Edgar Wikner Percival

1897 births
1984 deaths
Australian aerospace engineers
Aircraft designers
Australian Army officers
Australian military personnel of World War I
Australian World War I pilots
Fellows of the Institution of Mechanical Engineers
Fellows of the Royal Aeronautical Society
Fellows of the Royal Society
People educated at Fort Street High School
People from Albury, New South Wales
Royal Air Force officers
Royal Flying Corps officers
People with acquired American citizenship
Designers from London
Royal Air Force Volunteer Reserve personnel of World War II